Kundu may refer to:

People
 Agripina Kundu (born 1993), Kenyan volleyball player
 Nitun Kundu (1935–2006), Bangladeshi artist, sculptor and entrepreneur

Indians
 Gopal Kundu (born 1959), renowned Indian cell and cancer biologist
 Ritam Kundu (born 1983), Indian former cricketer
 Soumendranath Kundu (1942–2019), Indian cricketer
 Suman Kundu, wrestler from India

Other
 Equatorial Kundu, a a fictional African nation in the TV series The West Wing and The Newsroom
 Kundu (drum), an hourglass shaped drum used to accompany formal occasions
 Kundu (surname), a common Bengali Hindu surname found in India and Bangladesh
 Kundu equation, a general form of integrable system that is gauge-equivalent to the mixed nonlinear Schrödinger equation
 Kundu River, a tributary of the Penna River in the Rayalaseema region of Andhra Pradesh, India